Jodi Jones may refer to:

 Jodi Jones (footballer) (born 1997), English-Maltese professional footballer who plays for Oxford United as a winger
 Jodi Jones (murder victim), a Scottish teenager murdered in 2003